The Eklutna Dam, also referred to as the New Eklutna Dam or Upper Eklutna Dam, is an embankment dam on the Eklutna River about  northeast of Anchorage in Alaska, United States. The primary purpose of the dam is hydroelectric power generation and it supports a 47 MW power plant. It was first completed in 1929 but was rehabilitated or rebuilt on several occasions over its history. Ownership of the dam and power plant is shared by Anchorage Municipal Light & Power, Chugach Electric and Matanuska Electric.

Background
The original dams and power plant was the idea of businessman Frank Reed. It was constructed by the Anchorage Light and Power Company between 1927 and 1929 atop a natural landslide dam in the Eklutna Valley. It regulated the river to the Lower Eklutna Dam which diverted water into the Old Eklutna Power Plant. The lake dam was rebuilt and improved in 1941 after the previous structure failed. During this same year, the population in Anchorage increased greatly with the onset of World War II. To cope with increasing power demand, the United States Bureau of Reclamation proposed the Eklutna Project. It included raising the dam and installing a new power plant opposite Goat Mountain to the north, along the Knik River. The United States Congress authorized the project on 31 July 1950. Construction began in 1951 and raising the dam commenced the following year. The first generator was commissioned on 8 January 1955, the second and last on 1 April 1955. On 1 July 1955 the entire project was complete. The Great Alaska earthquake in March 1964 caused significant damage to the dam, particularly the water intake for the power plant. The intake shifted towards the lake and frozen alluvium beneath and near the dam's spillway densified, creating voids. Later, in July of the same year, as the ground thawed, two cracks formed near the spillway and portions of the dam filled the void. The dam was deemed unsafe and a taller
embankment dam was constructed just downstream.  Construction and rehabilitation was carried out until 1966. In 1997 the Alaska Power Authority sold the dam and power plant to Anchorage Municipal Light and Power, Chugach Electric Association and Matanuska Electric Association for US$6 million.

Design

From the intake, water rushes down the penstock where it reaches two 23.5 MW Francis turbine-generators. Water used by the power plant is then discharged into the Knik River.

References

Dams in Alaska
Embankment dams
Dams completed in 1955
1955 establishments in Alaska
Energy infrastructure completed in 1955
Hydroelectric power plants in Alaska
Buildings and structures in Anchorage, Alaska
United States local public utility dams